Birnin Magaji/Kiyaw is a Local Government Area in Zamfara State, Nigeria. Its headquarters are in the town of Birnin Magaji (or Magare) in the north of the LGA  at. The LGA is also named from the town of Kiyaw (or Kiawa) to the south.

It has an area of 1,188 km and a population of 178,619 at the 2006 census.

The postal code of the area is 882.

References

Local Government Areas in Zamfara State